Emil Berggreen (born 10 May 1993) is a Danish professional footballer who plays as a forward for Danish Superliga club SønderjyskE.

Career

Brønshøj
Brønshøj Boldklub signed Berggreen from FC Nordsjælland in the summer 2012. In his first half season, Berggreen played 2 matches as a substitute for the first team and scored one goal, while he also scored 10 goals in 6 matches for the U21 squad. He signed a contract extension in January 2013 for two years. Berggreen had an excellent second half season, where he in total played 21 games and scored 12 goals. After this season, Berggreen had bids from clubs in the Danish Superliga and the Danish 1st Division.

Hobro IK
On 20 June 2014, Hobro IK signed Berggreen on a three-year contract. He made his debut in the Danish first-tier for Hobro IK during the first half of the 2014–15 Superliga season.

He scored his first goal for the club in September after he had not scored in the first 13 games. After a great period in the fall, he attracted much attention from other clubs.

Eintracht Braunschweig
On 31 January 2015, Berggreen signed a -year contract with German 2. Bundesliga club Eintracht Braunschweig. On 8 February 2015, he made his debut for Braunschweig. He came on as a substitute in an 0–2 defeat on the 20th matchday against 1.FC Kaiserslautern, replacing Raffael Korte in the 69th minute. On 23 February 2015, made his debut in the starting line-up, in a 1–1 draw on the 22nd matchday against RB Leipzig, also scoring his first goal for Eintracht Braunschweig. On 25 May 2015, he came on as a substitute on the 31st matchday against FSV Frankfurt and contributed two goals to the 2–0 victory of his team.

Mainz 05
Berggreen moved to 1. FSV Mainz 05 on 31 January 2016. Hobro IK received about 2 million Danish crowns for the sale. A month after his arrival, he was injured and had to get his knee operated. He was back in training in the summer 2016. Weeks after his return, he suffered an anterior cruciate ligament injury and was out the rest of the season. By summer 2017, Berggreen had not made his debut yet.

Twente
On 17 July 2019, Berggreen joined FC Twente on a one-year contract with an option for one further year.

Greuther Fürth
In September 2020, free agent Berggreen returned to Germany joining 2. Bundesliga side SpVgg Greuther Fürth on a two-year contract. His contract was terminated by mutual consent on 1 January 2022, effectively making him a free agent again.

SønderjyskE
Berggreen signed with Danish Superliga club SønderjyskE on 31 January 2022, after having practiced with the Midtjylland first team through January. He signed a one-and-a-half-year deal.

International career
On 9 September 2014, Berggreen made his debut for the Danish U21 national team, and became the first Hobro player to ever represent a Danish national team at any level, scoring a goal in his debut.

Personal life
Berggreen's mother is from Croatia, so he can both represent Denmark and Croatia in international football.

References

1993 births
Living people
People from Helsingør
Association football forwards
Danish men's footballers
Denmark under-21 international footballers
Danish expatriate men's footballers
Danish Superliga players
2. Bundesliga players
Bundesliga players
Danish people of Croatian descent
Hobro IK players
Brønshøj Boldklub players
Eintracht Braunschweig players
1. FSV Mainz 05 players
FC Twente players
SpVgg Greuther Fürth players
SønderjyskE Fodbold players
Expatriate footballers in Germany
Danish expatriate sportspeople in Germany
Expatriate footballers in the Netherlands
Danish expatriate sportspeople in the Netherlands
Sportspeople from the Capital Region of Denmark